Harrold is an unincorporated community in eastern Wilbarger County, Texas, United States.

The Harrold Independent School District serves area students, including transfers from Electra and Vernon.

Demographics

2020 census

As of the 2020 United States census, there were 87 people, 46 households, and 30 families residing in the CDP.

References

External links
 
 A town in Texas lets teachers carry guns, 28 August 2008, International Herald Tribune

Unincorporated communities in Texas
Unincorporated communities in Wilbarger County, Texas